Zhang Yang may refer to:

Zhang Yang (warlord) (died 198), Chinese warlord of the late Han Dynasty
Chang Yang (born 1930), Hong Kong actor
Zhang Yang (director) (born 1967), Chinese film director
Zhang Yang (general) (1951–2017), Chinese general in the People's Liberation Army
Zhang Yang (ice hockey), Chinese ice hockey player, member of China Sharks ice hockey team
Zhang Yang (badminton), Chinese badminton player